Lance Michael Zeno (born April 15, 1967) is a former center in the National Football League.

Career

Zeno spent the 1992 NFL season in the Cleveland Browns. He would split the 1993 NFL season with the Browns and the Green Bay Packers.

He played at the collegiate level at the University of California, Los Angeles.

Zeno is currently the offensive line coach for Mater Dei High School, CA.

See also
List of Green Bay Packers players

References

1967 births
Living people
Players of American football from Los Angeles
American football centers
UCLA Bruins football players
University of California, Los Angeles alumni
Dallas Cowboys players
Sacramento Surge players
Cleveland Browns players
Tampa Bay Buccaneers players
Green Bay Packers players
St. Louis Rams players
Scottish Claymores players